Joop van Domselaar (11 September 1928 – 11 November 2006) was a Dutch sports shooter. He competed in two events at the 1964 Summer Olympics.

References

1928 births
2006 deaths
Dutch male sport shooters
Olympic shooters of the Netherlands
Shooters at the 1964 Summer Olympics
People from Driebergen-Rijsenburg
Sportspeople from Utrecht (province)